The 2009–10 LEB Plata season was the 10th season of the LEB Plata, second league of the Liga Española de Baloncesto and third division in Spain. It was also named Adecco Plata for sponsorship reasons.

Competition format
21 teams were divided in the first round in two groups of 12 and 11 teams. The six first qualified teams of each group will join the Group 1. In this Group 1, the winner will be promoted directly to LEB Oro. Teams from 2nd to 8th will join the promotion playoffs with the winner of the Group 2 (played with the remaining teams). The Group B winner will be the last seeded team in the playoffs. The results of the games of the first round between teams of the same group were included in the table for the second round.

The last qualified of the Group 2 was relegated to Liga EBA.

The leading teams of the first half of Groups A and B, played the Copa LEB Plata. The winner of this Cup, was the first seeded team in the promotion playoffs if it finished between the second and the fifth position of the Group 1 of the second round.

Eligibility of players
All teams must have in their roster:
A minimum of seven eligible players with the Spanish national team.
A maximum of two non-EU players.
A maximum of two EU players, which one can be a player from an ACP country.
If a team has not two non-EU players, it can sign a player of everywhere.

Teams can not sign any player after February 28.

Regular season

First round

Group A

Group B

Second round

Group 1

Group B

Copa LEB Plata
At the half of the first round, the two first teams in the table play the Copa LEB Plata at home of the winner of the first half season. The Champion of this Cup will play the play-offs as first qualified if finishes the league between the 2nd and the 5th qualified of the Group 1.

Lobe Huesca was the champion after defeating Huelva La Luz by 89–67.

Playoffs
Teams qualified from 2nd to 8th of the Group 1 and the winner of the Group 2 will play the promotion play-off. If the winner of Copa LEB Plata is qualified between 2nd and 5th at the final of the Regular Season, it will join the play-offs as 2nd qualified. Three best-of-five series will decide who promotes to LEB Oro with the champion of the league.

Final standings

MVP of the regular season
 Ronald Thompson (ADT Tarragona)

External links
LEB Plata website in FEB.es
Competition rules

LEB Plata seasons
LEB3